Burg Thalberg is a high medieval castle in Styria, Austria. It is probably the best preserved Romanesque fortification in the country.

See also
List of castles in Austria

References

This article was initially translated from the German Wikipedia.

Castles in Styria